Harold Ickes may refer to:

Harold L. Ickes (1874–1952), U.S. Secretary of the Interior in Franklin D. Roosevelt's administration
Harold M. Ickes (born 1939), son of the U.S. Interior Secretary, deputy White House Chief of Staff during the administration of U.S. President Bill Clinton